General Muhammad Musa Khan  was a Pakistan Army senior general who served as the 4th Commander-in-Chief of Pakistan Army from 1958 to 1966, under President Ayub Khan. Following his tenure as C-in-C of the Army, he later became a politician.

Gaining commission as a Second lieutenant in the British Indian Army, Khan served with distinction in the Burma and North African campaigns as part of the Allied effort in World War II. Following the Partition of India in 1947, he opted for the Dominion of Pakistan, subsequently transferring his military service to the newly created Pakistan Army. He led forward combat brigades against India during the First Kashmir War in 1947–1948, and eventually ascended the ranks to become C-in-C after the Pakistan Army imposed martial law in the country following the 1958 coup d'état. Khan gained notability and public fame throughout Pakistan when he was in command of the Pakistan Army during the Second Kashmir War with India in 1965.

Khan retired shortly after the 1965 war and embarked on a career in national politics, after which he was appointed to serve as the Governor of West Pakistan, a position he held from 1966 to 1969. In 1985, he was appointed as the Governor of Balochistan and remained in office until his death in 1991.

Early life and military career 
Musa was born on 20 October 1908 in Quetta, Baluchistan, British India to an ethnic Hazara family. His family was Sardar (lit. Chief) of Hazara tribe and was the eldest son of Sardar Yazdan Khan who was the local Tribal chief.

After his schooling, he was recruited to the British Indian Army as a Jawan in 1926 and eventually joined the 4th Hazara Pioneers after being promoted as the Naik a non-commissioned officer in the British Indian Army. He was selected to join the Indian Military Academy at Dehra Dun as a cadet in October 1932. In 1935, he was commissioned from the IMA, Dehradun following a two years and six months long military training. He was said to be an excellent sportsman and played hockey.

In 1936, he was posted to the 6th Royal Battalion of the 13th Frontier Force Rifles as a Platoon Commander and saw actions in the violent Waziristan campaign in 1936 until 1938. He participated well in the World War II on the side of the United Kingdom and served well in the Burma Campaign and North African theatre as part of the Norfolk Regiment of the British Indian Army. In Middle East, he led the company and was listed in mentioned in despatches for "distinguished services in the Middle East during the period February to July 1941" and in the London Gazette 30 December 1941 as a Lieutenant and acting Major.

In 1942, his heroic action for valor won him the praise and was appointed as Member of the Order of the British Empire (MBE) for "gallant and distinguished services in the Middle East." In 1945, he was promoted as substantive captain and substantive major in 1946 and was serving with the Machine Gun battalion, 13th Frontier Force Rifles by October 1942.

During his time at the Indian Military Academy, Musa was selected as part of the first batch of cadets. Called "The Pioneers", his class also produced Smith Dun and Sam Manekshaw, future army chiefs of Burma and India, respectively.

After the partition of British India that followed the establishment of Pakistan in 1947, he opted for Pakistan and joined the Pakistan Army as a staff officer. In 1947 in the acting rank of Brigadier, he commanded the 103rd Infantry Brigade based in Sialkot brigade in Kashmir and served as commander of military units in the first war with India. In 1948, he went on to command the 52nd Infantry Brigade positioned in Quetta.

After the war in 1948, Musa studied and graduated from the Command and Staff College in Quetta and proceeded to attend the Imperial Defence College in United Kingdom prior to his graduation.

Later military career 

In 1950s, Musa's commanding assignments included his role as the Commandant of the East Pakistan Rifles, and also having served as GOC of 14th Infantry Division in Dhaka, East Pakistan, in 1951. In 1952, his last field assignment included his role as General Officer Commanding (GOC) of 8th Infantry Division positioned in Quetta before stationed at the GHQ. Later, he soon became the Chief of Staff of the Pakistan Army (then the commander-in-chief of the army's deputy) in the rank of major-general at the Army GHQ. His career progressed well in the army and was ascended as Commander-in-Chief by President Ayub Khan in 1958 when the latter disposed President Iskander Mirza who imposed martial law in 1958. Musa's promotion to the four-star appointment came with controversy in the country as many saw that his appointment was based on "dependability rather than merit."

In October 1958, Musa was elevated as three-star general and appointed as Commander in Chief with Ayub Khan promoting himself as Field Marshal and promoting Musa to four star general later. President Ayub delegated the military affairs to General Musa when heading the civic government. In 1960, he was appointed to serve as the President of the Pakistan Hockey Federation which he remained in the post until being retired in 1966. It was during his stint as president when the Hockey Team won its first Gold Medal against the Indian Hockey Team in the Summer Olympics in Rome in 1960.

Bajaur Campaign 

In September 1960, Afghan Regular Troops disguised as local tribesmen started border incursions into the NWFP (now Khyber Pakhtunkhwa) province of Pakistan with the goal of starting a local rebellion to capture the Pashtun Inhabited Territory, under General Musa's leadership, Pakistani troops and Local Pashtun tribesmen along with Pakistan Airforce support pushed back the Afghans in 1961 and captured many Afghan soldiers.

The 1965 War 
In 1964, he became aware of covert operation studied by the Foreign ministry led by Foreign Minister Zulfikar Ali Bhutto, and presented views against the operation due to no linkage between the covert actions and the conventional backup. General Musa also had the support from President Ayub Khan on his views; however, the war began in 1965. General Musa did not order the Pakistan Army without the confirmation by President Ayub Khan despite Foreign Minister Bhutto's urging. After the Indian Army moved to the Rann of Kutch, General Musa ordered Army GHQ to respond to the Indian Army by moving the 12th Division. After reviewing the aerial view of the area and getting directions from President Ayub to make way for Maj General Yahya Khan, General Musa controversially relieved GOC Maj Gen Akhtar Hussain Malik and handed over the command of the 12th Division to Major-General Yahya Khan, which resulted in critical time delays of troop movements and eventual failure of the operation.

About the failure due to command change, General Musa justified his actions that he had not had time to select a commander or staff despite the authority given to him. He led and commanded the Pakistan Army in the largest tank battle, which earned him public fame. His strategy based on classical trench method supported by armory, artillery and airpower was tactically powerful and successful as it stopped the advancing Indian Army but politically unsuccessful due to the country being party of the peace treaty brokered by the USSR in 1965.

General Musa's military service is unique due to the fact that he had received two extension as a Commander-in-chief from the period of 1958 until 1966. Upon his retirement, General Musa did not recommend Yahya Khan's nomination as Commander-in-chief and Yahya's name was not included in the list of nomination sent to President Ayub Khan; nonetheless, General Musa was succeeded by General Yahya Khan as Commander in Chief.

About the war with India in 1965, General Musa provided his views and testimonies in two books written on military history of Pakistan Army: first being the "My Version" and the second being the "Jawan to General".

Politics 

At the time of his retirement in 1966, General Musa was a famed and popular military figure which led President Ayub Khan to appoint him as the Governor of West Pakistan. News of the appointment was met with enthusiasm by the West Pakistani people. In 1967, he became Governor of West Pakistan until submitting his resignation on 2 March 1969 when General Yahya Khan imposed martial law to takeover the presidency.

From 1969 to 1984, he settled in Karachi while receiving a military pension. In 1985, he became active in national politics on a Pakistan Muslim League platform led by Prime Minister M. K. Junejo. He was appointed as Governor of Balochistan by the President Zia-ul-Haq after the general elections held in 1985. After the general elections held in 1988, Governor Musa controversially dissolved the provincial assembly on the then-Chief Minister Zafarullah Khan Jamali's advice.

However, the Balochistan High Court restored the provincial assembly amid public condemnation of the Governor's move. The step towards dissolving the assembly was believed to have been taken with the consent of the President and Prime Minister.

On 12 March 1991, General Musa died while in office and per accordance to his wishes, he was buried in Mashhad, Razavi Khorasan, Iran. In his honour, the provincial Balochistan government established a vocational school, the General Muhammad Musa Inter-College (GMMIC), in Quetta, Pakistan in 1987.

Post-1965 war 

About the war with India in 1965, General Musa provided his views and testimonies in two books written on military history of Pakistan Army: the first being My Version and the second being Jawan to General. General Mohammad Musa, who commanded the Army in the '65 war, gave his account of how the events unfolded at GHQ, the C-in-C and the Supreme Commander Field Marshal Ayub Khan surprising India on 6 September 1965 in My Version.

Awards and decorations

Foreign Decorations

See also 
 List of Hazara people
 List of people from Quetta

References

External links 
 Official profile at Pakistan Army website

|-

1908 births
1991 deaths
Pakistani people of Hazara descent
People from Quetta
People from Karachi
Hazara people
Hazara politicians
Hazara military personnel
Indian Military Academy alumni
Frontier Force Regiment officers
British Indian Army officers
Indian Army personnel of World War II
Members of the Order of the British Empire
Graduates of the Royal College of Defence Studies
Pakistani generals
Commanders-in-Chief, Pakistan Army
Military personnel of the Indo-Pakistani War of 1965
Pakistani autobiographers
Pakistani memoirists
Pakistan Hockey Federation presidents
Governors of West Pakistan
Governors of Balochistan, Pakistan
Pakistan Muslim League politicians
Recipients of Hilal-i-Jur'at
Recipients of Hilal-i-Imtiaz
Pakistani sports executives and administrators
Generals of the Indo-Pakistani War of 1965
20th-century memoirists
Burials in Mashhad
Burials at Imam Reza Shrine
Indian Members of the Order of the British Empire
Pakistan Command and Staff College alumni